Ecotricity is New Zealand's carboNZero certified electricity provider.

History 
Ecotricity was founded in 2013 by Al and Mark Yates. It is headquartered in Auckland, NZ. Ecotricity is Kiwi and Community owned and has the capacity to supply up to 30,000 household equivalent.

Awards 
 Community Innovation
 Mega Efficiency Innovation

References

External links 
 Official website

Energy companies of New Zealand
New Zealand companies established in 2013